General Jackson may refer to:

People

United Kingdom
Alexander Cosby Jackson (1773–1827), British Army major general commanding Ceylon
Arnold Jackson (British Army officer) (1891–1972), British Army brigadier general
George Jackson (British Army officer) (1876–1958), British Army major general
Henry Jackson (British Army officer) (1879–1972), British Army general
James Jackson (British Army officer) (1790–1871), British Army general
Mike Jackson (British Army officer) (b. 1944), British general
Richard Downes Jackson (1777–1845), British Army lieutenant general
William Jackson (British Army officer) (1917–1999), British Army general

United States

U.S. Army
Andrew Jackson (1767–1845), U.S. Army general in the War of 1812 and seventh president of the United States
Charles Douglas Jackson (1902–1964), U.S. Army general
Conrad Feger Jackson (1813–1862), Union Army brigadier general
Dennis K. Jackson (born 1946), U.S. Army major general
Henry Jackson (Continental Army general) (1747–1809), Continental Army brevet brigadier general
James S. Jackson (1823–1862), Union Army general, American Civil War
Joseph Andrew Jackson Lightburn (1824–1901), Union Army brigadier general
Michael Jackson (American soldier) (1734–1801), Continental Army brevet general from Massachusetts
Nathaniel J. Jackson (1818–1892), Union Army brigadier general and brevet major general
Stonewall Jackson (20th century general) (1891–1943), U.S. Army major general
William Payne Jackson (1868–1945), U.S. Army brigadier general

Confederate States Army
Alfred E. Jackson (1807–1889), Confederate States Army brigadier general
Henry R. Jackson (1820–1898), Confederate States Army major general
John K. Jackson (1828–1866), Confederate general, American Civil War
Stonewall Jackson (1824–1863), Confederate general in the United States Civil War
William Hicks Jackson (1835–1903), Confederate States Army brigadier general
William Lowther Jackson (1825–1890), Confederate States Army brigadier general

Others
Gilder D. Jackson Jr. (1893–1966), U.S. Marine Corps brigadier general
James F. Jackson (born 1947), U.S. Air Force lieutenant general
Joel D. Jackson (fl. 1990s–2020s), U.S. Air Force major general

Others
Robert Jackson (general) (1886–1948), Australian Army major general

Other uses
 General Jackson (riverboat)

See also
Aleksander Jaakson (1892–1942), Estonian Army major general
Jackson Generals, a Minor League Baseball team in Jackson, Tennessee
Attorney General Jackson (disambiguation)
Jaxon (disambiguation)